Douglas "Doug" Graham  (born December 2, 1959) is a sailor from the U.S. Virgin Islands, who represented his country at the 1976 Summer Olympics in Kingston, Ontario, Canada, as crew member on the Soling. With helmsman Dick Johnson and fellow crew member Tim Kelbert, they took the 24th place.

References

External links
 
 
 

1959 births
Living people
United States Virgin Islands male sailors (sport)
Olympic sailors of the United States Virgin Islands
Sailors at the 1976 Summer Olympics – Soling